Jakob Let Haugaard (born 1 May 1992) is a Danish professional footballer who plays as a goalkeeper for Tromsø.

Haugaard began his career with Akademisk BK before moving to Danish Superliga side Midtjylland in December 2011. He was used as back-up 'keeper until the 2014–15 season where he helped Midtjylland win the Danish title. In the summer of 2015, Haugaard joined Premier League side Stoke City. Haugaard spent four seasons at Stoke and was used as third choice keeper making only a handful of appearances. He also had a short loan spell at Wigan Athletic.

Career

Midtjylland
Haugaard was born in Sundby and played in the youth teams at Tårnby Boldklub and Brøndby IF before he signed with Danish 1st Division side Akademisk BK in 2010. He broke through into the first team towards the end of the 2010–11 season playing 14 matches with the Gladsaxe Stadium club. His performances for AB attracted the interest of Danish Superliga side Midtjylland.

He signed for Midtjylland in December 2011. He spent the 2011–12 season with the reserve team. He made his Midtjylland debut on 27 July 2012 in a 2–2 draw away at AC Horsens. He went and played seven matches during the 2012–13 season. In 2013–14 he was used as back-up to Jonas Lössl and only made one appearance. The 2014–15 season was Haugaard's break-through season at Midtjylland as he played 23 times as the Wolves won their first Danish title.

Stoke City
On 27 May 2015, Haugaard signed a three-year contract with Premier League side Stoke City. Haugaard replaced compatriot Thomas Sørensen at the Britannia Stadium and Haugaard stated that he hopes to have the same impact as Sørensen. He made his debut for Stoke on 9 January 2016 in a 2–1 FA Cup victory away at Doncaster Rovers. Following a long-term injury to first choice goalkeeper Jack Butland, Haugaard was given his Premier League debut on 2 April 2016 in a 2–2 draw with Swansea City. He endured a tough time in his next match, away at Liverpool where he conceded four goals. He shared goalkeeper duties with Shay Given until the end of the 2015–16 season. Haugaard remained third choice goalkeeper at Stoke for the next three seasons and left the club at the end of the 2018–19 campaign.

Wigan Athletic (loan)
On 7 January 2017, Haugaard joined EFL Championship club Wigan Athletic on loan for the remainder of the 2016–17 season. He made his debut for Wigan on the same day in an FA Cup match against Nottingham Forest and saved a penalty as Wigan won 2–0. Haugaard was heavily criticised by Latics caretaker manager Graham Barrow following a 2–1 defeat at Brighton & Hove Albion on 17 April, describing the goals he conceded as "Sunday League" and admitting that he is only playing Haugaard because of the terms in the loan deal with Stoke. He returned to Stoke on 21 April 2017 after suffering a shoulder injury.

Career statistics

Honours
Midtjylland
Danish Superliga: 2014–15

References

External links

 
 
 Jakob Haugaard FCM profile
 Jakob Haugaard DBU profile

1992 births
Living people
Danish men's footballers
Danish expatriate men's footballers
AB Tårnby players
Akademisk Boldklub players
FC Midtjylland players
Stoke City F.C. players
Wigan Athletic F.C. players
AIK Fotboll players
Tromsø IL players
Association football goalkeepers
Danish Superliga players
Danish 1st Division players
Premier League players
English Football League players
Allsvenskan players
Eliteserien players
Expatriate footballers in England
Danish expatriate sportspeople in England
Expatriate footballers in Sweden
Danish expatriate sportspeople in Sweden
Expatriate footballers in Norway
Danish expatriate sportspeople in Norway